John Gerard O'Hara (born 18 April 1981, Dublin) is an Irish association football player, currently assistant coach for the George Mason University soccer teams.

Youth
O'Hara, who grew up in Foxford, County Mayo. He represented the Republic of Ireland at U-18 level and played for Belvedere. He attended college in the States at George Mason University where he was a four-year starter, four time all CAA conference team (2001–04), CAA Rookie of the Year (2001), and set many GMU school records.

Professional
O'Hara was invited to the MLS Combine after his final season at GMU but signed with Sligo Rovers in his native Ireland for the 2005 campaign. He helped guide Rovers to the Eircom Irish First Division crown and promotion to the Premier League in his first season. O'Hara has previously played in the United Soccer Leagues as a member of the Richmond Kickers Future PDL side where he earned 2003 Goalkeeper of the Year honors and All PDL League Team honors. O'Hara was one of the first players to sign with the expansion Carolina RailHawks. During the 2007 season, O'Hara saw time in only three league games and left the RailHawks at the end of the season. O'Hara signed with the Wilmington Hammerheads of the USL Second Division in the spring of 2008 where he served as captain of the team

O'Hara finished the 2008 season with DC United of the MLS, seeing time with their Reserve team.

Coach
In 2009, George Mason University hired O'Hara as its goalkeeper coach.

References

External links
 George Mason Patriots coaching staff: John O'Hara

1981 births
Living people
North Carolina FC players
Association football goalkeepers
George Mason Patriots men's soccer players
Association footballers from County Mayo
Republic of Ireland association footballers
Belvedere F.C. players
Sligo Rovers F.C. players
League of Ireland players
USL First Division players
Richmond Kickers Future players
USL Second Division players
Wilmington Hammerheads FC players
USL League Two players
Shelbourne F.C. players
Republic of Ireland youth international footballers
Irish expatriate sportspeople in the United States
Irish expatriate association footballers
Expatriate soccer players in the United States